The Power and the Glory is the third studio album by the band Cockney Rejects released in 1981.

Track listing 

 "The Power & the Glory"
 "Because I'm in Love"
 "On the Run"
 "Lumon"
 "Friends"
 "Teenage Fantasy"
 "It's Over"
 "On the Streets Again"
 "BYC"
 "The Greatest Story Ever Told"

All song written by Cockney Rejects.

References

1981 albums
Cockney Rejects albums
EMI Records albums